Dobwalls Football Club is a football club based in Dobwalls, Cornwall.

History
Dobwalls joined the East Cornwall League in 2002–03, finishing in the top five every season before being promoted to the South West Peninsula League Division One West on its formation in 2007. They spent twelve seasons in that division with a top finish of seventh in 2008–09. At the end of 2018–19 the league was restructured, and Dobwalls successfully applied for promotion to the Premier Division West, at Step 6 of the National League System. Dobwalls entered the FA Vase for the first time in 2021–22.

The Club House
The club opened a new clubhouse in March 2017, and the ceremony was performed by Neil Warnock, with Sheryll Murray MP in attendance.

Honours
League
Plymouth & District League Div 2 Runners up; 1988-89
Plymouth & District League Div 2 3rd place; 1992-93
Plymouth & District League Div 1 3rd place; 1993-94
Duchy Division One Winners; 1998-99; 2001-02
Duchy Premier League Champions: 2001-02
East Cornwall Premier League runner-up; 2006-07
Cups
Isaac Foot Cup
Runners-up 1938
Cornwall Charity Cup
Runners-up 2013 &2014
Duchy Knock-Out Cup
Winners: 2001
Duchy Premier Cup
Winners: 1999 & 2002
Launceston Cup
Winners: 1972; 1987; 1997; 2000; 2001, 2018
Runners-up; 1975, 1982, 1989, 2017
Duchy Supplementary Cup
Winners: 1976/77

References

External links
Dobwalls Football Club official website: https://dobwallsfootball.club/

Association football clubs established in 1922
1922 establishments in England
Football clubs in England
Football clubs in Cornwall
South West Peninsula League